Robert Kirk Bowman (born September 30, 1952) is a Canadian retired professional ice hockey winger. He played 88 regular season games in the National Hockey League for the Chicago Black Hawks. He currently does periodic work on behalf of the Blackhawk Alumni Association.

References

External links

1952 births
Living people
Canadian ice hockey forwards
Chicago Blackhawks players
Columbus Golden Seals players
Dallas Black Hawks players
Flint Generals players
Greensboro Generals (EHL) players
Greensboro Generals (SHL) players
Ice hockey people from Ontario
Los Angeles Sharks players
New Brunswick Hawks players
People from Leamington, Ontario
SC Bern players
Schwenninger Wild Wings players
Undrafted National Hockey League players
Canadian expatriate ice hockey players in Germany
Canadian expatriate ice hockey players in Switzerland